Amir Hassanpour, (17 November 1943 – 24 June 2017;), was a prominent Iranian-Kurdish scholar and researcher. He was born in Mahabad, in north-western Iran. He received his B.A. degree in English language in 1964 from University of Tehran. He taught in the secondary schools of Mahabad in the period of 1965-1966.

In 1968, he began studying linguistics at Tehran University, and received his M.A. in 1970. He finished his doctoral work in 1972, while teaching for a year at the University of Tehran. Then he went to the University of Illinois at Urbana-Champaign, where he studied communications and received his Ph.D. in 1989 in the field of sociolinguistics and contemporary Middle Eastern history. The title of his thesis is The Language Factor in National Development: The Standardization of the Kurdish Language, 1918-1985. His thesis was published as a book under the title: Nationalism and Language in Kurdistan, 1918-1985 by Edwin Mellen Pr; illustrated edition (May 1992) 
He lived in Canada from 1986, and taught at University of Windsor, Concordia University, and University of Toronto. He was associate professor at the Department of Near and Middle Eastern Civilizations at the University of Toronto. His areas of interest for the course were media, conflict and democracy and critical approaches to nationalism, ethnic conflict, genocide, and social movements. He died, aged 73, in Toronto.

Dr. Hassanpour was a leftist scholar combining a high level of theoretical knowledge with his practical activities for freedom and social justice. He used to be in the forefront of many actions and demonstrations against tyranny and exploitation. He has written scholarly work on the crime of genocide with special focus on the Armenian and Assyrian genocides of 1915 to 1921 in Ottoman Empire. He was among few scholars who attracted global attention to the Assyrian genocide.

References

External link 

Kurdish Academy of Language- Biography of Dr. Amir Hassanpour
Amir Hassanpour archival papers held at the University of Toronto Archives and Records Management Services

1943 births
2017 deaths
Iranian Kurdish people
Kurdish-language writers
Linguists from Canada
Academic staff of Concordia University
Academic staff of the University of Toronto
Kurdish scholars
Kurdish social scientists
People from Mahabad
Kurdish sociologists